The 1995 European Indoors was a women's tennis tournament played on indoor carpet courts at the Saalsporthalle Allmend in Zürich in Switzerland and was part of the 1995 WTA Tour. It was the 12th edition of the tournament and was held from 2 October through 8 October 1995. Seventh-seeded Iva Majoli won the singles title and earned $150,000 first-prize money.

Finals

Singles

 Iva Majoli defeated  Mary Pierce 6–4, 6–4
 It was Majoli's 1st singles title of her career.

Doubles

 Nicole Arendt /  Manon Bollegraf defeated  Chanda Rubin /  Caroline Vis 6–4, 6–7(4–7), 6–4

References

External links
 ITF tournament edition details
 Tournament draws

European Indoors
Zurich Open
1995 in Swiss tennis
1995 in Swiss women's sport